Ernst Emil Paul Barth (born on 1 August 1858 in Baruthe near Oels, Silesia; died on 30 September 1922 in Leipzig), known simply as Paul Barth, was a German sociologist and philosopher.

Biography

He edited the Vierteljahrsschrift für wissenschaftliche Philosophie (Quarterly Journal for Scholarly Philosophy), and was extraordinary professor in the University of Leipzig. He wrote on philosophical subjects, but is known above all for his Philosophie der Geschichte als Sociologie (Philosophy of History as Sociology), the first volume of which appeared in 1897. This book is one of the most authoritative historical sketches of the development of sociological theory which had been published in Germany.

Among Barth's other writings were:
 Geschichtsphilosophie Hegels und die Hegelianer bis auf Marx und Hartmann (Hegel's philosophy of history and the Hegelians up to Marx and Hartmann; 1890)
 Tiberius Gracchus (2d ed., 1893)
 Beweggründe des sittlichen Handelns (Motives for acting ethically; 1889)

Notes

1858 births
1922 deaths
German philosophers
German sociologists
Writers from Leipzig
Philosophers of history
German male writers